Naft Al-Basra SC is a football club based in Al-Tamimia District, Basra, Iraq, that plays in Iraqi Premier League.

History

Name changes
The club was founded on 27 November 1979 as "Naft Al-Junoob", before changing to the name "Al-Rumaila" on 6 March 1990, and returned to the name "Naft Al-Junoob" on 20 April 2003, the club played in Iraqi Premier League at the 2004–05 season for the first time.

On October 23, 2020, the club's management, which was elected a few days prior, decided to change the name of the club from "Naft Al-Junoob" to "Naft Al-Basra" and officially announced this, as they changed the logo.

Rivalries

Naft Al-Basra contest the Basra Derby with Al-Mina'a. Since 2005, there have been 29 competitive Basra Derbies. Al-Mina'a hold the precedence in these matches, with 10 victories to Naft Al-Basra's 7; there have been 12 draws. The most decisive result in an Al-Mina'a–Naft Al-Basra game is Al-Mina'a's 4–1 victory at Al Mina'a Stadium, their home ground, on March 11, 2005. There have been two incidences of 3–1, Al-Minaa have been won in both matches; home in December 2005, and away in January 2006. The competition saw 54 goals scored, 30 for Al-Mina'a and 24 for Naft Al-Basra; the individual player who scored the most goals was Al-Mina'a player Ihsan Hadi and Naft Al-Basra player Bassim Ali, each scored four goals. And there are five players who scored for both teams, they are Alaa Aasi, Nasser Talla Dahilan, Ahmed Hassan, Sajjad Abdul Kadhim and Hussam Malik.

Current squad

First-team squad

Out on loan

Personnel

Current technical staff

{| class="toccolours"
!bgcolor=silver|Position
!bgcolor=silver|Name
!bgcolor=silver|Nationality
|- bgcolor=#eeeeee
|Manager:||Emad Aoda||
|- 
|Assistant manager:||Salim Nayrouz||
|- 
|Goalkeeping coach:||Akram Sabeeh||
|-bgcolor=#eeeeee
|Fitness coach:||Dhurgham Brazili||
|- 
|Reserve Coach:||Ali Jassim||
|- 
|U19 Manager:||Muntasser Hamdan||
|- 
|U16 Manager:||Ahmed Hassan||
|- 
| Administrative director:||Alaa Nayrouz||
|-

Board members

{| class="toccolours"
!bgcolor=silver|Position
!bgcolor=silver|Name
!bgcolor=silver|Nationality
|-bgcolor=#eeeeee
|President:||Ali Hanoon||
|-
|Vice-president:||Hassan Abdul Hadi||
|-bgcolor=#eeeeee
|Secretary:||Aaliyah Makki||
|-
|Treasurer:||Asaad Karim Jassim||
|- bgcolor=#eeeeee
|Member of the Board:||Sajjad Kadhim||
|- 
|Member of the Board:||Hisham Mohammed||
|-bgcolor=#eeeeee
|Member of the Board:||Mohammed Karim||
|- 
|Member of the Board:||Maan Abdul Hassan||
|-bgcolor=#eeeeee
|Member of the Board:||Aqeel Najem ||
|- 
|Member of the Board:||Ali Abdul Karim Hashim||
|-

Managerial history
  Hassan Mawla 
  Abdul Karim Jassim 
  Abdul Razzaq Ahmed 
  Aqeel Hato 
  Asaad Abdul Razzaq 
  Abdul Karim Jassim 
  Hameed Salman 
  Adel Nasser 
  Emad Aoda 
  Hassan Mawla 
  Ali Wahab 
  Adel Nasser 
  Ammar Hussein 
  Salim Nayrouz 
  Emad Aoda

Records

All-time top goalscorers

Players in bold are still available for selection.

Honours
Oil Minister's Cup
Winners (1): 2010
Thaghr al-Iraq Championship
 Runners-up (1): 2009

Other games

Handball 
The Naft Al-Basra handball team won the Iraqi Handball League title at 2013–14 and 2014–15 seasons. The team also participated in Asian Club League Handball Championship and Arab Handball Championship of Champions as a representative of Iraq.

References

External links
 Official website
 Club page on goalzz.com
 Basra Clubs Union

Football clubs in Iraq
1979 establishments in Iraq
Football clubs in Basra
Association football clubs established in 1979